The Ministry of Municipal Affairs and Housing is the ministry of the Government of Ontario that is responsible for municipal affairs and housing in the Canadian province of Ontario. The current Minister of Municipal Affairs and Housing is Steve Clark.

History
The Department of Municipal Affairs was established in 1934 by the Department of Municipal Affairs Act, which was passed in 1935. It inherited the municipal administrative and regulatory functions which had briefly been the responsibility of the Ontario Municipal Board. Initially, it was responsible for supervising the affairs of the municipalities whose real property tax-revenue base had collapsed during the Depression. After The Second World War, it became more involved in the provision of administrative and financial advice and support to municipalities.

From 1947 until 1955, the Minister of Municipal Affairs acted as the Registrar General, and the Office of the Registrar General was attached to the department. This office was transferred to the Department of the Provincial Secretary in 1955.

In April 1972, the department was dissolved, with most of its functions being transferred to the newly created Ministry of Treasury, Economics and Inter-governmental Affairs, but with the assessment function being given to the Ministry of Revenue. 

In 1973, the Ministry of Housing was established by The Ministry of Housing Act, inheriting the Plans Administration Branch from the Ministry of Treasury, Economics and Intergovernmental Affairs, as well as the Ontario Housing Corporation from the Ministry of Revenue.

In 1981, the Ministry of Municipal Affairs and Housing was formed by the consolidation of municipal affairs functions into the Ministry of Housing.

List of Ministers

References

External links
 

Municipal Affairs and Housing
Ontario